Kanubhai Mathurambhai Baraiya is an Indian politician from the state of Gujarat. Kanubhai Mathurambhai Baraiya is MLA from Talaja, Bhavnagar. He belongs to Indian National Congress party.

References

1964 births
Living people
Indian National Congress politicians from Gujarat